Stephanie "Stephie" D'Souza, nee Sequeira (26 December 1936 – 11 September 1998) was a sportsperson who represented India in athletics and women's hockey.

Early life
Stephanie "Stephie" D Souza, inheritably Sequeira, was born on 26 December 1936. She studied at the  Sardar Dastur Girls School at Pune, and later shifted to the Fergusson College to do her graduation. She worked with Central Railways (Pune Division). After her marriage, she shifted to Jamshedpur.

D'Souza was part of the Indian team that won the gold in the 4 × 100 m relay in the 1954 Asian Games (with Violet Peters, Chirstine Brown and Mary D'Souza) and a bronze in 1958. She won a silver in the 200 m, creating an Asian record in the semifinal, and finished fourth in the 100 m in the latter competition. At one point, she held the national records in 100 m, 200 m, 400 m and 800 m. She was the first Indian woman to complete 100m in 12 seconds, beating the previous record of 12.1 by Mary D'Souza, at Pune in 1956.

She was eliminated in the first round of the 400 m in the 1964 Summer Olympics after finishing sixth despite setting a national record of 58.0 seconds. She took part in the 100 yards and 220 yards sprints in the 1958 Commonwealth Games. D'Souza represented India in the first international women's hockey tournament in London in 1953 and captained the side in 1961.

Stephie D'Souza won the Arjuna Award presented by the Government of India. She died in Jamshedpur (Jharkhand) at the age of 61.

National and international competitions

See also
 List of Indian women athletes

Bibliography 

 K.R. Wadhwaney, Arjuna Awardees, Publications Division, Ministry of Information and Broadcasting, Government of India, 2002,

References

1936 births
1998 deaths
Olympic athletes of India
Sportswomen from Goa
Indian Roman Catholics
Athletes (track and field) at the 1964 Summer Olympics
Recipients of the Arjuna Award
Indian female sprinters
20th-century Indian women
20th-century Indian people
Asian Games medalists in athletics (track and field)
Athletes (track and field) at the 1954 Asian Games
Athletes (track and field) at the 1958 Asian Games
Commonwealth Games competitors for India
Athletes (track and field) at the 1958 British Empire and Commonwealth Games
Field hockey players from Goa
Athletes from Goa
Asian Games gold medalists for India
Asian Games silver medalists for India
Asian Games bronze medalists for India
Medalists at the 1954 Asian Games
Medalists at the 1958 Asian Games
Olympic female sprinters